Károly Sós (5 April 1909 – 3 August 1991), was a Hungarian footballer and manager. After playing for various clubs he became a coach, most notably with Ferencvárosi TC, Bp. Honvéd SE, East Germany and Hungary.

References 

1909 births
1991 deaths
Footballers from Budapest
Hungarian footballers
Hungarian football managers
Vasas SC players
Olympique Alès players
Szombathelyi Haladás football managers
Újpest FC managers
Budapest Honvéd FC managers
Ferencvárosi TC managers
East Germany national football team managers
Hungary national football team managers
Expatriate football managers in East Germany
US Saint-Malo players
Hungarian expatriate sportspeople in Czechoslovakia
Expatriate footballers in Czechoslovakia
Hungarian expatriate sportspeople in France
Hungarian expatriate sportspeople in Switzerland
Hungarian expatriates in East Germany
FC Bern players
Association football midfielders